The school is located at 10504 Kettle Run Road, Nokesville, Virginia.  The school opened in September 2011.

Originally simply "High School #11," Kettle Run High School was the working name of the new high school in the western portion of Prince William County, Virginia that was completed in September 2011.

Referred to in documents of July 2006 as "High School (West)," the property is named for its geographic region, located NW of Nokesville, Virginia. The school property itself is located near the intersection of Schaeffer Lane and Kettle Run Road in a triangle of land south of Vint Hill Road (Route 215) and west of Kettle Run Road.

Immediately adjoining the property is the site of an elementary school to be built concurrently. In the January 20 meeting, the school board also announced that this school would be named  T. Clay Wood Elementary School .

Background
Early estimates of the school's total construction cost was set at $74,000,000 as published in July 2006 by the Prince William County Schools in "Approved Capital Improvement Projects; Fiscal Year 2007-16." Following the budgetary conversations for the coming school year, in the 2006-2007 year, as published in a similar document for the 2008-16 year, the school's estimated date of opening was moved from September 2010 to September 2011, and the price was revised upwards to $95,410,000 for the school listed as "High School @ Kettle Run." After the economic downturn of late 2008, revised figures became available. Following a unanimous favorable School Board vote to award the contract to Hess Construction (who built the existing PWCS facility Freedom High school), PWCS News Release 162, dated 8 January 2008, stated the awarded construction contract had been settled upon at $70,700,000. (The total Capital Improvements Plan had allowed for $82 million for this expense, yielding a significant savings.)

According to the News Release, "The project will be paid for with bonds over the next 20 years with the impact on [2010]’s budget being $1.4 million."

The county's construction plans  for the site are available online.

According to Prince William County Planning Commission Public Facility Review #PLN2007-00079, dated February 7, 2007, the high school's proposed capacity stands at 2,053 students. According to the same document, this falls below the recommendations of the established "Level of Service" (LOS) standard of 2,150 students. Again in the same document, it is stated that three new high schools are required by 2010, and current plans show that zero new high schools will be completed for the 2010–2011 school year.

Enrollment

Beginning in the 2013–2014 school year ten trailers were installed to provide additional space.  2,053 is not inclusive of the additional enrollment provided by the trailers.

Demographics

In the 2017–2018 school year, Patriot's student body was:
11.1% Black/African American
15.7% Hispanic 
53.4% White
12.6% Asian
6.8% Two or More Races
.3% American Indian/Alaskan
.2% Hawaiian/Pacific Islander

Communities served
Alison's Ridge
Ashley's Ridge
Braemar
Bridlewood
Bridlewood Manor
Broad Run Oaks
Foxborough
Morris Farm
Glenkirk Estates
Kingsbrooke
Lake Manassas
Laurianne Woods
New Bristow Village**
New Dominion Hunt Estates
Pineborough Estates
Rocky Run
Old Rocky Run
Saybrooke
Somerset
Virginia Oaks
Saranac
With the opening of the 12th high school in 2016, New Bristow Village will be rezoned to Brentsville High School
In fall of 2021 Patriot will serve the Victory Lakes Neighborhood.

Controversy
During the boundary process between 2008 and 2009 the communities on the eastern side of Linton Hall Road (Victory Lakes, Sheffield Manor, Crossman's Creek, Barrett's Crossing, and Lanier Farms) all expressed interest in being rezoned from Unity Reed High School to the new Patriot High School.  All of the communities are in Bristow and attend Marsteller or Gainesville Middle schools, the schools which feed into Patriot High School.  However, as a result of foreseen overcrowding the communities were left at Stonewall Jackson which upset many parents and students as they were being separated from friends and area neighbors. It resulted in many transfers to other area schools notably Patriot and Brentsville.

Before the start of the 2014–2015 school year, Patriot High School closed to transfers.

Overcrowding
As of 2015 Patriot High School is the most overcrowded high school in Prince William County.  The school opened to relieve Battlefield and Brentsville High Schools who were then experiencing extreme overcrowding.  During the 2010–2011 school year (the year before Patriot's opening) Brentsville had one-way hallways to deal with its extensive overpopulation.  Parents and school board members were aware that Patriot would become overcrowded quickly as a result of the fast growth in the Bristow and Gainesville areas.  In the 2013–2014 school year Patriot acquired ten trailers to help alleviate the overcrowding.  Prince William County Schools has an open-transfer policy to any school within the county, however beginning in the 2013–2014 school year Patriot was closed to transfers to reduce student increases.  Patriot will receive some relief in 2016 when the 12th high school opens as New Bristow Village will be rezoned to Brentsville High School. However, a longer-term solution will not come until 2019 or later when the 13th high school opens in the western end of the county.

See also
Prince William County Public Schools

References

External links
pwcs.edu
pwcs.edu
Patriot High School
Patriot High School Athletics

Public high schools in Virginia
Schools in Prince William County, Virginia
2011 establishments in Virginia
Educational institutions established in 2011